2016 Vissel Kobe season.

Squad
As of 13 February 2016.

Out on loan

J1 League

References

External links
 J.League official site

Vissel Kobe
Vissel Kobe seasons